Harmony Township is one of twenty-four townships in Hancock County, Illinois, USA.  As of the 2010 census, its population was 326 and it contained 153 housing units.  It was formed from Carthage and Chili townships on September 12, 1854.

Geography

Cities, towns, villages
 Bentley

Unincorporated towns
 Denver at 
(This list is based on USGS data and may include former settlements.)

Cemeteries
The township contains these seven cemeteries: Browning, Denver, Harmony, Immanuel Lutheran, Mount Pleasant, Ramsey and Scott.

Major highways
  Illinois Route 94

Airports and landing strips
 Mabry Landing Strip
 McPherson Airport

Demographics

School districts
 Carthage Elementary School District #317
 Illini West High School District #307

Political districts
 Illinois's 18th congressional district
 State House District 94
 State Senate District 47

References
 United States Census Bureau 2008 TIGER/Line Shapefiles
 
 United States National Atlas

External links
 City-Data.com
 Illinois State Archives
 Township Officials of Illinois

Townships in Hancock County, Illinois
Townships in Illinois